Colin Bateman (born 22 October 1930 in Hemel Hempstead) is an English former professional footballer who played in the Football League as a full back for Watford. He joined the club from Hemel Hempstead in 1953 and made 50 league appearances between the 1954–55 and 1957–58 seasons, before returning to non-league football with Sittingbourne.

Bateman's older brother Ernie also played for the same three clubs.

References

1930 births
Association football defenders
English footballers
Footballers from Hertfordshire
Sportspeople from Hemel Hempstead
Hemel Hempstead Town F.C. players
Living people
Sittingbourne F.C. players
Watford F.C. players